IRP may mean any of the following in:

Science and technology 
Integration Reference Point in telecommunications
NIH Intramural Research Program
I/O request packet, in Microsoft Windows
 Iron Removal Plant, in water treatment
Iron-responsive element-binding protein or iron regulatory protein

Political and international organizations 
 Initiative of the Republic of Poland, a former Polish political party
 International Recovery Platform, a joint initiative of United Nations agencies, international financial institutions, national and local governments, and non-governmental organizations engaged in disaster recovery
 Institute of Revolutionary Practice, educational institution affiliated with the Kuomintang
 International Registration Plan of transportation carriers in North America
 The International Reporting Project, funds independent journalistic coverage
 International Resource Panel, for sustainable use of natural resources
 International Responsa Project, a Schlesinger Institute project concerning medical issues and Jewish law
 Islamic Renaissance Party of Tajikistan
Islamic Republic of Pakistan
Islamic Republic Party, former Iranian political party

Other 

 IRP, IATA code for Matari Airport
 Irp., Irpinian dialect
Indianapolis Raceway Park, a short track in Indianapolis, Indiana
Individual'nyi Ratsion Pitaniya (IRP) (Индивидуальный рацион питания (ИРП)), Russian military rations
Integrated Rail Plan for the North and Midlands, UK government plan for its railways 
Integrated Resource Plan, used in South Africa and by United States energy utilities